German Igorevich Tuayev (born 7 April 1992) is a former Russian professional football player.

Club career
He made his Russian Football National League debut for FC Alania Vladikavkaz on 7 June 2011 in a game against FC Torpedo Moscow.

External links
 
 
 Career summary by sportbox.ru

1992 births
Sportspeople from Vladikavkaz
Living people
Russian footballers
FC Spartak Vladikavkaz players
Association football forwards
Association football defenders